Unión Deportiva Fuengirola Los Boliches is a Spanish football team based in Fuengirola, Málaga, in the autonomous community of Andalusia. Founded in 2001 after a merger of UD Fuengirola and CD Los Boliches, it plays in Primera Andaluza, holding home matches at Estadio Municipal de Santa Fe de los Boliches.

Club background
Club Deportivo Fuengirola - (1931–1992) → ↓
Club Atlético Fuengirola - (1982–1992) → ↓
Unión Deportiva Fuengirola - (1992–2001) → ↓
Asociación Deportiva Balompédica Fuengirola - (1984–1992) → ↑
Unión Deportiva Fuengirola Los Boliches - (2001–present)
Club Deportivo Los Boliches - (1973–2001) → ↑

Season to season

4 seasons in Tercera División

External links
La Preferente team profile 
ArefePedia team profile 
Soccerway team profile

Football clubs in Andalusia
Association football clubs established in 2001
2001 establishments in Spain